"S.O.B." is a song by American rock band Nathaniel Rateliff & the Night Sweats. It was released as the lead single from their self-titled debut album. The song gained exposure after the band performed it on Jimmy Fallon's The Tonight Show on August 5, 2015.

Content
Rateliff has said the song is, at heart, a troubled song about drinking one's life away after a break-up, and explained that the lyrics are based on his personal experience with delirium tremens during alcohol withdrawal. He also described it as a "joke song" and said that originally his band did not plan to record it, but due to positive reception, did so and released it as a single.

Music video
The music video was released on July 15, 2015. It was directed and edited by Greg Barnes, and produced by Melissa Giles. The video depicts Nathaniel Rateliff and his band performing the song in front of an audience of prisoners and is an homage to the end credits scene of the 1980 film The Blues Brothers.

Usage in media
In late May 2016 and again in 2017, "S.O.B." was featured on Lipton's iced tea commercials.
In April 2017, "S.O.B." was featured in the season three premiere of FX's Fargo.
In May 2017, "S.O.B." was featured in an advertisement for Infiniti's Spring sales campaign.
In February 2018, "S.O.B." was featured in promos for the second season of the IFC comedy Brockmire.
"S.O.B." is used as the theme for the BBC sitcom Two Doors Down.
It was also featured in the first episode of DC Comics “Titans” series in Netflix in October 2018.
The song features in the Netflix series Atypical, playing in Season 3, Episode 10, titled "Searching for Brown Sugar Man", released 1 November 2019.

Charts and certifications

Weekly charts

Year-end charts

Certifications

See also
List of Billboard number-one adult alternative singles of the 2010s

References

2015 singles
2015 songs
Stax Records singles
Songs about alcohol